Camille Claudel is a 1988 French biographical drama film about the life of 19th-century sculptor Camille Claudel. The film was based on the book by Reine-Marie Paris, granddaughter of Camille's brother, the poet and diplomat Paul Claudel. It was directed by Bruno Nuytten, co-produced by Isabelle Adjani, and starred her and Gérard Depardieu. The film had a total of 2,717,136 admissions in France. Adjani was nominated for the Academy Award for Best Actress for her role, the second in her career.

Premise
The film recounts the troubled life of French child prodigy sculptor Camille Claudel and her long relationship with the (married) sculptor Auguste Rodin. She was the daughter of a devoutly Catholic, socialite mother and a wealthy, French businessman, while the latter was sympathetic to her highly iconoclastic, secular art, her mother found it odious. Beginning in the 1880s, with the young Claudel's first meeting with Rodin, the film traces the development of their intense romantic bond. The growth of this relationship coincides with the rise of Claudel's career, helping her overcome prejudices against female artists. However, their romance soon sours, due to the increasing pressures of Rodin's fame and his love for another woman. After Claudel's father dies, she's at the mercy of her mother's ire. These difficulties combine with her increasing doubts about the value of her work drive Claudel into an emotional tumult, and while her zealot mother wants her institutionalized, her sympathetic brother tries to comfort her and promote her artwork.

Cast
 Isabelle Adjani as Camille Claudel
 Gérard Depardieu as Auguste Rodin
 Laurent Grévill as Paul Claudel
 Alain Cuny as Louis-Prosper Claudel
 Madeleine Robinson as Louise-Athanaïse Claudel
 Philippe Clévenot as Eugène Blot
 Katrine Boorman as Jessie Lipscomb
 Maxime Leroux as Claude Debussy
 Danièle Lebrun as Rose Beuret
 François Berléand as Doctor Michaux

Awards
 1989 – nominated for two Academy Awards
 Academy Award for Best Actress
 Academy Award for Best Foreign Language Film
 1989 – received five César Awards, including the César Awards for Best Film and Best Actress
 1989 – Isabelle Adjani received the Silver Bear for Best Actress at the 39th Berlin International Film Festival

Reception 

On Rotten Tomatoes, the film has an aggregated score of 92% based on 12 reviews.

See also
 Camille Claudel 1915, 2013 film
 Rodin, 2017 film
 List of submissions to the 62nd Academy Awards for Best Foreign Language Film
 List of French submissions for the Academy Award for Best Foreign Language Film
 Mental illness in films

References

External links
 
 
 

1988 films
1988 drama films
1980s biographical drama films
Best Film César Award winners
Biographical films about sculptors
Cultural depictions of Auguste Rodin
Cultural depictions of Camille Claudel
Films based on biographies
Films directed by Bruno Nuytten
Films featuring a Best Actress César Award-winning performance
Films scored by Gabriel Yared
French biographical drama films
1980s French-language films
Gaumont Film Company films
1980s French films